The 1990 LSU Tigers football team represented Louisiana State University in the 1990 NCAA Division I-A football season.  The Tigers played their home games at Tiger Stadium in Baton Rouge, Louisiana.

Coach Mike Archer announced his resignation November 15, but he coached the Tigers in their last two games.

Schedule

Personnel

Season summary

Kentucky
Harvey Williams 213 rush yards

at Florida St

References

LSU
LSU Tigers football seasons
LSU Tigers football